Milvus is a genus of medium-sized birds of prey. The genus was erected by the French naturalist Bernard Germain de Lacépède in 1799 with the red kite as the type species. The name is the Latin word for the red kite.

Species
This is an Old World group that forms part of the subfamily Milvinae. The genus contains three species.

Allozyme data indicates that the genetic diversity in both black and red kites is rather low. Successful hybridization between Milvus kites is fairly commonplace, making mtDNA analyses unreliable to resolve the genus' phylogeny. Furthermore, there is no good correlation between molecular characters and biogeography and morphology in the red kite due to very incomplete lineage sorting.

The yellow-billed kite is apparently a separate species, as indicated by mtDNA phylogeny showing two supported clades, biogeography, and morphology. The black-eared kite is somewhat distinct morphologically, but is better considered a well-marked parapatric subspecies. The status of the Cape Verde kite is in doubt; while not a completely monophyletic lineage according to mtDNA data, it is still best regarded as a distinct species. Whatever its status, this population is extinct.

A prehistoric kite from the Early Pleistocene (1.8 million–780,000 years ago) deposits at Ubeidiya (Israel) was described as Milvus pygmaeus.

References

Crochet, Pierre-André (2005): Recent DNA studies of kites. Birding World 18(12): 486–488. HTML section list

 
Bird genera